Fontitrygon is a genus of stingrays in the family Dasyatidae found in coastal tropical Atlantic waters and rivers that drain into the Atlantic. Fontitrygon species were formerly contained within the genus Dasyatis.

Species
Fontitrygon colarensis (Santos, Gomes & Charvet-Almeida, 2004) (Colares stingray)
Fontitrygon garouaensis (Stauch & Blanc, 1962) (Niger stingray)
Fontitrygon geijskesi (Boeseman, 1948) (Sharpsnout stingray)
Fontitrygon margarita (Günther, 1870) (Daisy stingray)
Fontitrygon margaritella (Compagno & Roberts, 1984) (Pearl stingray)
Fontitrygon ukpam (Smith, 1863) (Pincushion ray)

References

 
Dasyatidae
Taxa named by Peter R. Last
Taxa named by Bernadette Mabel Manjaji-Matsumoto